Schilling Power Station was an oil-fired power station in the proximity of the nuclear power station at Stade. It went into operation in 1960, was extended in 1962 and 1964, and was shut down in the 1980s. Since it principally served Hamburg north for the electricity supply of Hamburg and fed its current into the transformer station, the first overhead line crossing of the Elbe was built at that time at Stade, the Elbe Crossing 1. The buildings still exist today and are occasionally used for disaster control exercises.

Due to the use of heavy fuel oil, a chimney was built with a height of 722 feet or 220 metres, it was 1962-1965 the tallest chimney worldwide. It was an open lattice structure with three separate exhaust pipes from the blocks. The structure was demolished in 2005.

See also

 List of tallest demolished freestanding structures
 List of tallest chimneys
 Lattice tower

References

Stade
Stade Schilling
Stade Schilling
Stade Schilling
Stade Schilling
Stade Schilling
Stade Schilling
Economy of Lower Saxony